Sund is a former municipality in the old Hordaland county in Norway. The municipality existed from 1838 until its dissolution in 2020 when it joined Øygarden Municipality in Vestland county. It was located in the traditional district of Midhordland. The administrative centre of the municipality was the village of Skogsvåg. Other larger villages in Sund included Klokkarvik, Tælavåg, Kausland, and Hammarsland.

Sund covered the southern third of the island of Store Sotra, west of the city of Bergen. It also included many smaller, surrounding islands. Sund was a predominantly rural municipality, with no major settlements, the largest being Hammarsland with approximately 900 inhabitants (in 2013). Due to the proximity to the city of Bergen, a large proportion of the population commuted to the city to work.

Prior to its dissolution in 2020, the  municipality is the 381st largest by area out of the 422 municipalities in Norway. Sund is the 149th most populous municipality in Norway with a population of 7,058.

General information

The parish of Sund was established as a formannskapsdistrikt (municipality) on 1 January 1838. It originally included many islands to the southwest of the Bergen Peninsula. On 1 January 1886, the southern archipelago in Sund (population: 2,396) was separated to form the new Austevoll Municipality. This left Sund with 2,112 residents.

On 1 January 2020, the three neighboring municipalities of Fjell, Sund, and Øygarden were merged into one large island municipality called Øygarden.

Name
The municipality was named after the old Sund farm, where the first Sund Church was built. The name is identical with the Norwegian word "sund", which translates into English as "strait".

Coat of arms
The coat of arms was granted on 23 March 1988. They show a blue lighthouse on a white or silver background. This symbolized the importance of the se and the alertness of the local population. The previous arms were in use from 1966 until 1988 and the new 1988 arms were a simplified version of the old arms. The previous arms were blue with a black and white lighthouse on an island surrounded by waves.

Churches
The Church of Norway had one parish within the municipality of Sund. It is part of the Vesthordland prosti (deanery) in the Diocese of Bjørgvin.

Transport
The Sotra Bridge, opened in 1971, drastically improved travel to and from Sund and it spurred rapid population growth after ages of stagnancy. Due to the rapidly increasing traffic across the bridge and on the highways of Sotra, the Norwegian Public Roads Administration developed plans in the 2000s for a new bridge and highway between Bergen and Sotra. The plans include a new dual carriageway bridge to replace the Sotra Bridge, and new highways that lead northwards to Øygarden and southwards to Sund.

History

On 26 April 1942, after having discovered that two men from the Linge company were being hidden in Telavåg, the Gestapo arrived to arrest the Norwegian officers. Shots were exchanged, and two prominent German Gestapo officers, Johannes Behrens and Henry Bertram, and the Norwegian Arne Værum, were shot dead. Reichskommissar Josef Terboven ordered the Gestapo to retaliate, burning all buildings in the village, executing or sending the men to the Sachsenhausen concentration camp, and imprisoning the women and children for two years. In addition, 18 Norwegian prisoners at a Norwegian internment camp were killed as a reprisal. The event has since become known as the "Telavåg tragedy", and is sometimes compared to similar World War II atrocities, such as the Lidice massacre, with higher death tolls.

Geography

Sund covered the southern third of the island of Store Sotra, as well as the many islands that surround it. The largest of the smaller islands are Toftøya, Lerøyna, Bjelkarøyna, Tyssøyna, Risøy, Vardøy, Golten, and Viksøy.

The treacherous waters in the area mean there has been a continuous need for piloting services, and this tradition is kept alive by the "Viksøy Losstasjon".

Climate
On an average, Sotra experiences  of rainfall annually, less than the  that the nearby city of Bergen receives.

Settlements
There were six urban settlements, as defined by Statistics Norway, within the border of the municipality. The largest is Hammarsland in northern Sund, with 875 inhabitants as of 2013. The others are Tælavåg, Skogsvåg, Klokkarvik, Forland, and Glesnes.

Government
The municipal council  of Sund was made up of 21 representatives that are elected to four year terms. The party breakdown of the final municipal council was as follows:

See also
List of former municipalities of Norway

References

External links

Municipal fact sheet from Statistics Norway 

 
Øygarden
Former municipalities of Norway
1838 establishments in Norway
2020 disestablishments in Norway